Roncherolles-sur-le-Vivier is a commune in the Seine-Maritime department in the Normandy region in northern France.

Geography

Population

Places of interest
 The church of the Trinity, dating from the seventeenth century.
 The manorhouse de Bimare.
 The seventeenth-century château de Guillerville and its chapel.

See also
Communes of the Seine-Maritime department

References

External links

Official website of Roncherolles-sur-le-Vivier 
Le Vivier de Roncherolles Website 

Communes of Seine-Maritime